The Pingdingshan village massacre was a massacre committed by the Imperial Japanese Army on September 16, 1932.

On September 15, Anti-Japanese Red Spear militia, not from the area but passing through Pingdingshan, fired on Japanese soldiers and later attacked the Japanese garrison in the nearby industrial city of Fushun. The next day in retaliation Japanese soldiers and police in tracking the rebels as they fled back through the villages, assumed all who were in the vicinity either to be members of the militia or their confederates and punished them, by burning homes and summarily executing, bayoneting and machine-gunning village residents. Chinese sources place the number of victims at 3,217. Japanese sources place the number of victims at 800. The village was burned down and destroyed.

In 1972, remains of about 800 dead  compatriots were found in a mass grave 80 by 5 metres in size. A memorial hall was constructed to house these remains. It is situated in Xinbin Manchu Autonomous County in the prefecture of Fushun, China.

A group of Chinese survivors of the massacre demanded 20 million yen from the Japanese government in reparations. In 2006, the Japanese Supreme Court ruled that a national court could not grant wartime indemnities, as this was a matter for international treaties.

References

External links 
  平頂山慘案紀念館 (Pingdingshan Massacre Memorial Hall)

Conflicts in 1932
Massacres in 1932
Massacres in China
1932 in Japan
Fushun
Buildings and structures in Fushun
Second Sino-Japanese War crimes
September 1932 events
1932 murders in China
Massacres committed by Japan